Branislav Šušolík (born 16 October 1998) is a Slovak football defender who is currently free agent

Club career

MŠK Žilina
He played for MŠK Žilina since 2007. He made his Fortuna Liga debut for Žilina against Skalica on 26 February 2016.

International career 
 2016/2017 - Slovakia national under-19 football team
 2015/2016 - Slovakia national under-18 football team
 2014/2015 - Slovakia national under-17 football team 
 2013/2014 - Slovakia national under-16 football team
 2012/2013 - Slovakia national under-15 football team
 2011/2012 - Regional Slovakia national under-14 football team

References

External links
  
 
  

1998 births
Living people
People from Bytča
Sportspeople from the Žilina Region
Slovak footballers
Slovakia youth international footballers
Association football defenders
MŠK Žilina players
FK Senica players
MŠK Púchov players
Slovak Super Liga players
2. Liga (Slovakia) players